The Ilyushin Il-108 is a twin-jet business-aircraft project, drafted in 1990 by the Russian manufacturer Ilyushin.  A first model was presented in the same year, but apparently no Il-108 ever took to the air. It is similar in appearance to the Canadair Challenger 300.

Design
The draft listed two models, a nine-seater executive aircraft and a 15-passenger commercial aircraft, both low-winged and possessing a T-tail. The Il-108 is powered by two Lotarev DV-2 turbofans attached to the top of the rear fuselage on either side of the tail, each providing a thrust of 21.6 kN.

Variants
A second version was planned to be equipped with Lotarev DV-22 turbofan derivatives having a bypass ratio of 5 and a 35 kN thrust.

Specifications

References

Il-108
Abandoned civil aircraft projects
1990s Soviet and Russian civil utility aircraft